Mark Janssen (born 10 May 1992) is a Dutch footballer who plays as a striker for VV Geldrop. He formerly played on loan for Helmond Sport.

References

External links
 Voetbal International profile 

1992 births
Living people
Dutch footballers
Association football forwards
Eredivisie players
Eerste Divisie players
RKC Waalwijk players
Helmond Sport players
Footballers from Eindhoven